The ordination of women in the Anglican Diocese of Sydney is restricted to the diaconate (IE as deacons). The diocese rejects the ordination of women as priests (or presbyters) and bishops.

Diocesan position
One of the differences between Sydney and the majority of other Anglican dioceses in Australia has been its unwillingness to allow the ordination of women to the priesthood (itself a term infrequently used in the diocese) or presbyterate. This issue is an indicator of Sydney's difference in ecclesiology and theology to most other dioceses within the Anglican Communion.

For many Anglicans outside Evangelical churches and even for many Sydney Anglicans within Evangelical churches, the central act of worship is the celebration of the Eucharist. Within the Anglican Communion the Eucharist can only be presided over by an ordained priest (presbyter). For many who have opposed the ordination of women the sex of the priest who presides at the Eucharist has been a major issue. But in the Sydney diocese the sex of the person who presides at the Eucharist is of less significance than the matter of headship in the church and in the preaching and teaching which is central to Evangelical ministry.

Interpretations of the teachings of Paul
The reason for Sydney's strong opposition towards the ordination of women to the presbyterate is based partly upon their  interpretation of the teachings of the Apostle Paul in respect to the understanding of the Greek word kephale (κεφαλη) mentioned in Ephesians 5:23, as well as the prohibition given to female teachers in 1 Timothy 2:11 and the roles of men and women outlined in his first letter to the Corinthians.

The diocese has, however, ordained women as deacons since 1989. Women who are ordained as priests outside the diocese, such as Sue Pain who returned to Sydney to take up the position of assistant at St James', King Street, are acknowledged by the diocese as a deacons rather than priests. In 1994 Harry Goodhew appointed a deacon, Dianne "Di" Nicolios, as archdeacon in charge of women's ministries.

Legal action
In 1992 a then member of the standing committee of the diocesan synod, Laurie Scandrett, joined with Dalba Primmer (the then Rector of St John's Bega in the Diocese of Canberra and Goulburn) and David Robarts (then the incumbent of Christ Church, Brunswick in the Diocese of Melbourne) in a court action (Scandrett v Dowling (1992) 27 NSWLR 483) to prevent the Bishop of Canberra and Goulburn from ordaining women as presbyters. The action failed in the New South Wales Court of Appeal although it delayed the ordination by several months.

Continuing disagreement
Sydney's stand on this issue has been a source of bitterness for a minority within the diocese, as indicated by the bulletins of the Movement for the Ordination of Women, as well as an occasional cause of tension between Sydney and the Diocese of Melbourne. However, a number of prominent Sydney Anglicans who are supportive of the ordination of women have ministered or are currently ministering in Melbourne — for example Peter Watson (Archbishop of Melbourne, 2000–2006), Stephen Hale, Bishop of the Eastern Region and Dianne Nicolios, Archdeacon for Women's Ministries.

Archdeacon for Women's Ministries
The most senior female in the diocese is the Archdeacon for Women's Ministries. The title is often shortened to the Archdeacon for Women. The role created in 1993 as "an Archdeacon with special responsibilities for women's ministry".

 January 1994 – May 2002: The Revd Dianne "Di" Nicolios; resigned to be ordained a priest in the Diocese of Melbourne
 November 2002 – 2012: The Revd Narelle Jarrett
 2012 – present: The Revd Kara Hartley (née Gilbert)

References 

Australia
Anglican Diocese of Sydney
History of women in Australia